The 2016–17 Houston Baptist Huskies men's basketball team represented Houston Baptist University in the 2016–17 NCAA Division I men's basketball season. The season was head coach Ron Cottrell's 26th season at HBU. The Huskies played their home games at Sharp Gymnasium as members of the Southland Conference. They finished the season 17–14, 12–6 in Southland play to finish in a three-way tie for second place. They lost in the quarterfinals of the Southland tournament to Sam Houston State. The Huskies received an invitation to the CollegeInsider.com Tournament where they lost in the first round to Campbell.

Previous season 
The Huskies finished the 2015–16 season 17–17, 10–8 in Southland play to finish in fifth place. They defeated Southeastern Louisiana in the quarterfinals of the Southland tournament before losing to Stephen F. Austin in the semifinals. The Huskies received an invitation to the College Basketball Invitational where they lost in the first round to UNC Greensboro.

Media
All Houston Baptist games were broadcast online live by the Legacy Sports Network (LSN). LSN also provided online video for every non-televised Huskies home game. However HBU games did air on ESPN3 as part of the Southland Conference TV packages.

Roster

Schedule and results

|-
!colspan=12 style=|Regular season

|-
!colspan=12 style=| Southland tournament

|-
!colspan=12 style=| CIT

See also
2016–17 Houston Baptist Huskies women's basketball team

References

Houston Christian Huskies men's basketball seasons
Houston Baptist
Houston Baptist
Houston Baptist Huskies basketball
Houston Baptist Huskies basketball